Peter McCracken may refer to:

Pete McCracken, Australian composer, guitarist and singer-songwriter
Peter McCracken (footballer, born 1883) (1883–1936), Australian rules footballer for St Kilda
Peter McCracken (footballer, born 1949), Australian rules footballer for South Melbourne
Peter McCracken (footballer, born 1869) (1872–1948), Scottish footballer for Chesterfield Town, Middlesbrough and Nottingham Forest

See also
Peter McCrackan (1844–1928), Australian politician